The Bagalini Baganfibio (a portmanteau of "Bagalini" and "Amphibian") is an Italian homebuilt flying boat that was designed by Marino Bagalini. The aircraft is supplied in the form of plans for amateur construction.

Design and development
The Baganfibio features a strut-braced high-wing, a two-seats-in-tandem enclosed cockpit, retractable conventional landing gear and a single engine in tractor configuration mounted above the wing.

The aircraft is of all-wooden construction, with its wings covered in doped aircraft fabric. The aircraft does not use tip floats, but instead relies on sponsons for balance in the water.

The manufacturer estimates the construction time from the supplied kit as 700 hours.

Specifications (Baganfibio)

References

External links
Photo of a Bagalini Baganfibio

Baganfibio
1960s Italian sport aircraft
1990s Italian ultralight aircraft
Single-engined tractor aircraft
High-wing aircraft
Homebuilt aircraft
Flying boats